The 39th National Basketball Association All-Star Game was held at Houston on February 12, 1989. Karl Malone was named the NBA All-Star Game Most Valuable Player (MVP).

The east was composed of Mark Jackson, Kevin McHale, Michael Jordan, Patrick Ewing, Moses Malone, Charles Barkley, Isiah Thomas,  Dominique Wilkins, Mark Price, Terry Cummings, Larry Nance and Brad Daugherty.

The west was led by the Utah Jazz trio of Karl Malone, John Stockton and Mark Eaton; the Lakers' James Worthy, Kareem Abdul-Jabbar, Clyde Drexler, Alex English, Chris Mullin, Akeem Olajuwon, Tom Chambers, Dale Ellis and Kevin Duckworth.

The game set a new NBA All-Star attendance record. Neither Magic Johnson nor Larry Bird played, though both were still active in the NBA. Johnson was selected, but sat out due to injuries and was replaced by Abdul-Jabbar. Though he only scored 4 points, the game ended with Abdul-Jabbar hitting the final shot of the game, a sky hook.

The game featured a rap by rap group Ultramagnetic MCs that named each all-star and each coach. The rap was broadcast immediately before the start of the game.

The coaches were Lenny Wilkens for the East and Pat Riley for the West.

Rosters

Magic Johnson was unable to play due to injury. Kareem Abdul-Jabbar was selected as his replacement.
Western Conference head coach Pat Riley chose John Stockton to start in place of the injured Johnson.

Score by periods
 

Halftime— West, 87-59
Third Quarter— West, 111-96
Officials: Hugh Evans, Dick Bavetta, and Bill Saar
Attendance: 44,735 (NBA All-Star Record)

NBA All-Star Legends Classic
This 6th straight edition featuring the East from the likes of  Bobby Jones, Spencer Haywood, Paul Westphal, Dave Cowens, Tiny Archibald, Oscar Robertson, Jamaal Wilkes, Zelmo Beaty, Hot Rod Hundley, and Tom McMillen.
The West featured the likes of Calvin Murphy, Mike Newlin, Don Chaney, Earl Monroe, Lucious Jackson, Clifford Ray, Rick Barry, Elvin Hayes, Rudy Tomjanovich, and Dan Issel.

References 

National Basketball Association All-Star Game
All-Star
Sports competitions in Texas
NBA All-Star
GMA Network television specials